Eagle Field is a 500+ seat on campus soccer/track and field stadium in Statesboro, Georgia, United States. It is home to the Georgia Southern Eagles men's and women's soccer teams as well as cross country and track and field events. It is located in Erk Russell Athletic Park which is shared with Allen E. Paulson Stadium (football) as well as other football buildings.

It was completed in 2005. On October 10, 2012, the first ever night soccer game was played at Eagle Field with newly installed lights with Georgia Southern playing Elon.

The stadium hosted the 2018 Sun Belt Conference Men's Soccer Tournament. The stadium has also served as the host institution for the Southern Conference Outdoor Track & Field Championships three times, most recently in 2013. 

USL League One team Tormenta FC play at Eagle Field. In 2021, the team plans to move to a 5,300 seater soccer-specific stadium in Statesboro, which is currently under construction.

References

Georgia Southern Eagles
Soccer venues in Georgia (U.S. state)
College soccer venues in the United States
Athletics (track and field) venues in Georgia (U.S. state)
College track and field venues in the United States
2005 establishments in Georgia (U.S. state)
Sports venues completed in 2005
Buildings and structures in Bulloch County, Georgia
USL League One stadiums